Gavin O'Connor (born December 24, 1963) is an American film director, screenwriter, producer, playwright, and actor.  He is best known for directing the films Miracle, Warrior, The Accountant, and The Way Back.

Life and career
Gavin O'Connor was raised in Huntington, New York, on Long Island. He wrote and produced Ted Demme's directorial debut, the short film The Bet.

Three years later, he made his own feature film co–writing and directing debut with Comfortably Numb, about the moral dilemmas facing a Connecticut preppie-turned-New York City prosecutor; the film was screened at both the Cannes Film Festival and the Boston Film Festival. O'Connor then turned to the stage, producing, writing, and starring in the Off-Broadway play Rumblings of a Romance Renaissance in 1997.

At the same time, O'Connor began work on a screenplay based on then-wife Angela Shelton's memories of her childhood spent on the road with her serial-marrying mother.

Impressed by Tony Award-winning British actress Janet McTeer's appearance on Charlie Rose's talk show in 1997, he was determined to cast her in what had become Tumbleweeds (in which he co-starred); he and Shelton were forced to finance the film themselves after being unable to find backers. The movie won the Filmmakers Trophy at the Sundance Film Festival; McTeer's performance earned her a Golden Globe as Best Actress and Academy Award and Screen Actors Guild nominations in the same category; and Kimberly J. Brown, cast as her pre-teen daughter, won an Independent Spirit Award for Best Debut Performance.

In 2004, after serving as executive producer of several smaller, independent projects, O'Connor directed the film Miracle, based on the true story about the American ice hockey team's victory over the Soviet Union at the 1980 Winter Olympics. He also produced the Mark Kerr HBO documentary film, The Smashing Machine.

O'Connor filmed the MMA film Warrior, for which he wrote the screenplay and directed. The film received a 2011 release, through Lions Gate Entertainment.

In 2013, O'Connor was working on adapting the novel The Hustler into a stage play. In April 2013, he signed on to direct Jane Got a Gun.

He executive produced and directed the pilot episode of the FX series The Americans. He directed and produced the pilot episode of the Netflix series Seven Seconds.
In June 2014, O'Connor was set to direct his upcoming action-adventure film, Massacre in the Himalayas, which Gianni Nunnari's Hollywood Gang Productions will produce about the murder of ten climbers and the local Pakistani cook who are intent on conquering the K2 summit. He directed the WWII drama Atlantic Wall, starring Bradley Cooper.

On September 6, 2017, O'Connor landed the role of director and writer of The Suicide Squad. By October, O'Connor had exited the project due to his story treatment reportedly being identical to Birds of Prey, as well as his commitments to The Way Back.

Personal life
O'Connor married actress Brooke Burns on June 22, 2013. He was previously married to Angela Shelton.

Filmography

Producer only

Acting credits

Television

References

External links

1963 births
American male actors
20th-century American dramatists and playwrights
Film producers from New York (state)
American male screenwriters
American theatre directors
Living people
People from Long Island
University of Pennsylvania alumni
Film directors from New York (state)
People from Huntington, New York
American male dramatists and playwrights
20th-century American male writers
Screenwriters from New York (state)